John B. Nelson House is a historic home close to Port Penn, New Castle County, Delaware.  It was built in the early 19th century, and consists of a two-story, four-bay by three-bay core with a one-room wing. It has a two-story wing added in the mid-19th century. It is a stuccoed brick structure.

It was listed on the National Register of Historic Places in 1978.

References

Houses on the National Register of Historic Places in Delaware
Houses in New Castle County, Delaware
National Register of Historic Places in New Castle County, Delaware